The Convention on the Territorial Sea and Contiguous Zone of 1958 is an international treaty which entered into force on 10 September 1964, one of four agreed upon at the first United Nations Conference on the Law of the Sea (UNCLOS I). 52 states are parties to the convention, whether through ratification, succession, or accession.

Many parties to this convention have since ratified the 1982 United Nations Convention on the Law of the Sea, which came into force in 1994 and supersedes this convention for those states that have ratified UNCLOS.

References

External links
 Convention on the Territorial Sea and the Contiguous Zone, Done at Geneva on 29 April 1958

1964 in the environment
Treaties concluded in 1958
Treaties entered into force in 1964
Law of the sea treaties
Treaties of Australia
Treaties of the Byelorussian Soviet Socialist Republic
Treaties of Belgium
Treaties of Bosnia and Herzegovina
Treaties of the Kingdom of Cambodia (1953–1970)
Treaties of the People's Republic of Bulgaria
Treaties of Croatia
Treaties of the Czech Republic
Treaties of Czechoslovakia
Treaties of Denmark
Treaties of the Dominican Republic
Treaties of Fiji
Treaties of Finland
Treaties of the Hungarian People's Republic
Treaties of Haiti
Treaties of Israel
Treaties of Italy
Treaties of Jamaica
Treaties of Japan
Treaties of Kenya
Treaties of Latvia
Treaties of Lithuania
Treaties of Lesotho
Treaties of Madagascar
Treaties of Malaysia
Treaties of Malawi
Treaties of Malta
Treaties of Mauritius
Treaties of Mexico
Treaties of Montenegro
Treaties of the Netherlands
Treaties of Nigeria
Treaties of the Estado Novo (Portugal)
Treaties of the Socialist Republic of Romania
Treaties of the Soviet Union
Treaties of Senegal
Treaties of Serbia and Montenegro
Treaties of Sierra Leone
Treaties of Slovakia
Treaties of Slovenia
Treaties of the Solomon Islands
Treaties of South Africa
Treaties of Francoist Spain
Treaties of Eswatini
Treaties of Switzerland
Treaties of Thailand
Treaties of Tonga
Treaties of Trinidad and Tobago
Treaties of Uganda
Treaties of the Ukrainian Soviet Socialist Republic
Treaties of the United Kingdom
Treaties of the United States
Treaties of Venezuela
Treaties of Yugoslavia
Treaties extended to the Netherlands Antilles